Hassan Ahmed is a Pakistani actor and model. He earned critical acclaim for his roles in television series Saiqa, Zindagi Dhoop Tum Ghana Saya and Meri Saheli Meri Humjoli. His performance in series Agar Tum Na Hotay earned him Best Soap Actor nomination at 3rd Hum Awards.

Personal life
Ahmed was born in Karachi on April 14, 1982. He graduated from the Institute of Business Management in MBA. In 2009, he married his co-star, Sunita Marshall 
, in an Islamic wedding, and then had a Catholic ceremony three months later, as his wife is Christian.

He was kidnapped in 2013 for ransom and was freed after 35 days.

Television

Awards

 2014: Hum Award for Best Soap Actor - Agar Tum Na Hotay - nom.

References

External links
 

Living people
Pakistani male models
Pakistani Muslims
Pakistani male television actors
Male actors from Karachi
Kidnapped Pakistani people
1982 births